Catherine Imbriglio is an American poet.

Life
Catherine was born and lives in Rhode Island.
She graduated from Regis College, Boston College, Brown University, M.A. (creative writing), and Ph.D. 1995.  She teaches at Brown University.

Her work has appeared in American Letters & Commentary, Caliban, Center: A Journal of the Literary Arts, Conjunctions, Contemporary Literature, Denver Quarterly, Epoch, First Intensity, Indiana Review,  New American Writing, No: A Journal of the Arts, Pleiades, WebConjunctions.

Awards
 2008 Norma Farber First Book Award Parts of the Mass
 Untermeyer fellowship in poetry
 merit award in poetry from the RI State Council on the Arts
 Brown University UCS award for excellence in teaching.

Work

Poetry

Anthologies
 The Iowa Anthology of New American Poetries, ed. Reginald Shepherd (University of Iowa Press, 2004).

References

Year of birth missing (living people)
Living people
Boston College alumni
Brown University alumni
Brown University faculty
Regis College alumni
Poets from Rhode Island
American women poets
American women academics
21st-century American women